Ray Vaughn Denslow (1885–1960) was an author, poet, and historian of Freemasonry.   Ray was noted for many different pieces of writing including that of I Am Freemasonry.  His other books include A Handbook for Royal Arch Masons, Masonic Rites and Degrees, The Masonic World, and Freemasonry in the Western Hemisphere. Ray was a former Grand Master (Freemasonry) in the state of Missouri.

See also
 Masonic appendant bodies

References

1885 births
1960 deaths
20th-century American writers
American Freemasons
Masonic Grand Masters